Master LC was a Flemish painter who flourished from  1525–50. His painting, "The Arrival in Bethlehem" (1540) is owned by the Metropolitan Museum of Art.

16th-century Flemish painters
Year of birth unknown
Year of death unknown